Pain Killer was the fourth album from Northern Ireland-based rock band, Energy Orchard, and was released in 1995.

Track listing
All tracks composed by Bap Kennedy; except where noted.
 "Wasted" - 4:48
 "She's the One I Adore" (Bap Kennedy, Paul Toner) - 4:06
 "Remember My Name" - 4:41
 "The Past Is Another Country" (Bap Kennedy, Kevin Breslin) - 5:38
 "I Hate to Say Goodbye" (Bap Kennedy, Kevin Breslin) - 6:55
 "Pain Killer" - 4:29
 "D.F. Dogs" - Instrumental) - (Bap Kennedy, Spade McQuade) - 4:21
 "The Shipyard Song" - 3:53
 "Surrender to the City" - 4:50
 "A Sight for Sore Eyes"

References

1995 albums
Energy Orchard albums